Alexandra Vandernoot (born 19 September 1965) is a Belgian actress.

Career
While having starred in a number of French films, she is known internationally as Tessa Noël, Duncan MacLeod's girlfriend, in the fantasy television series Highlander: The Series. Her character was introduced in the series premiere, and she appeared through the fourth episode of season 2, "The Darkness," in which her character was killed off. She later returned in the Highlander second-season finale, "Counterfeit Part Two," as a woman made-up to look like Tessa, and also in the series finale as Tessa Noël.

Vandernoot had a small part as a French television reporter in the 1994 film Pret-a-Porter (Ready to Wear). She also appeared in Le Dîner de Cons as Christine Brochant.

In 2007, she played an engineer in Ondes de choc, a mini-series produced by the French public channel France 3 retracing an accident at a chemical factory comparable to the AZF factory disaster, a chemical factory which exploded on 21 September 2001 in Toulouse, France.

In 2008, she played a role in the made-for-television movie Un vrai Papa Noël by comedian Jean-Marie Bigard.

Personal life
She is the daughter of Yugoslavia-born ballerina Dušanka Sifnios and Belgian conductor André Vandernoot.

Vandernoot has two children with Bernard Uzan.

Filmography 
 1991 : Les secrets professionnels du Dr Apfelglück
 1992 : The Supper
 1992–1998 : Highlander: The Series (TV series, 28 episodes)
 1994 : Prêt-à-Porter
 1998 : The Dinner Game
 2000 : Sabotage!
 2001 : The Closet(2001)
 2010 : Joséphine, ange gardien TV Series (1 Episode : "Chasse aux fantômes")

References

External links

1965 births
Living people
Actresses from Brussels
Belgian people of Serbian descent
Belgian television actresses
Belgian film actresses
20th-century Belgian actresses
21st-century Belgian actresses